Doran Grant (born November 30, 1992) is a former American football cornerback. He played college football at Ohio State.

High school career
Grant attended St. Vincent–St. Mary High School in Akron, Ohio. During his career he had 203 tackles and six interceptions on defense and 88 receptions for 1,115 yards and 25 touchdowns on offense. Grant was a four-star recruit by Rivals.com and was ranked as the No. 3 cornerback in his class.

In track & field, Grant competed as both a hurdler and a sprinter. In 2010 Grant won the state title in the 60m hurdles indoors, and the 110m hurdles outdoors. He had personal-bests of 11.38 in the 100m, 23.4 in the 200m, 8.05 in the 60m hurdles and 14.22 in the 110m hurdles.

Grant's father, Ted Jones, played college football at Michigan State University in 1980s.

College career
Grant played in all 13 games as a true freshman at Ohio State University in 2011. As a sophomore in 2012, he played in 12 games with one start and had one interception. Grant became a starter for the first time his junior season in 2013. He started all 14 games, recording 58 tackles and three interceptions. He returned as a starter his senior season in 2014.

Professional career

Pittsburgh Steelers
The Pittsburgh Steelers selected Grant in the fourth round (121st overall) of the 2015 NFL draft. The Steelers signed Grant on May 11, 2015, but released him on September 6. On September 7, 2015, Grant was signed to the Steelers practice squad. On November 4, 2015, Grant was signed to the Steelers active roster. On September 3, 2016, he was released by the Steelers as part of final roster cuts.

Buffalo Bills
On September 5, 2016, Grant was signed to the Bills' practice squad. He was released from the Bills' practice squad on September 13, 2016.

New York Giants
Grant was signed to the New York Giants' practice squad on September 27, 2016. He was released on October 19, 2016.

Jacksonville Jaguars
On October 24, the Jacksonville Jaguars signed Grant to their practice squad. He signed a reserve/future contract with the Jaguars on January 2, 2017.

On September 2, 2017, Grant was placed on injured reserve. He was released on September 18, 2017.

Chicago Bears
On September 26, 2017, Grant was signed to the Chicago Bears' practice squad. He signed a reserve/future contract with the Bears on January 1, 2018.

On September 1, 2018, Grant was waived by the Bears.

Atlanta Legends
On October 12, 2018, Grant signed with the Arizona Hotshots of the Alliance of American Football, but eventually joined the Atlanta Legends for the 2019 AAF season. The league ceased operations in April 2019.

DC Defenders
Grant was drafted in the 4th round during phase four in the 2020 XFL Draft by the DC Defenders. He had his contract terminated when the league suspended operations on April 10, 2020.

Winnipeg Blue Bombers
Grant signed with the Winnipeg Blue Bombers of the CFL on May 28, 2020. After the CFL canceled the 2020 season due to the COVID-19 pandemic, Grant chose to opt-out of his contract with the Blue Bombers on September 3, 2020.

References

External links
Ohio State Buckeyes bio

1992 births
Living people
Players of American football from Akron, Ohio
American football cornerbacks
Ohio State Buckeyes football players
Pittsburgh Steelers players
Jacksonville Jaguars players
Chicago Bears players
Atlanta Legends players
DC Defenders players
St. Vincent–St. Mary High School alumni
Winnipeg Blue Bombers players